Meniscoessus is a genus of extinct mammal from the Upper Cretaceous Period of what is now North America. It was a member of the extinct order Multituberculata, lying within the suborder Cimolodonta and family Cimolomyidae.

Taxonomy

The genus Meniscoessus was named by Edward Drinker Cope in 1882. It has also been known under the following names: Cimolomys  (partly); Dipriodon (Marsh 1889); Halodon (Marsh 1889); Oracodon (Marsh 1889); Moeniscoessus; Selenacodon (Marsh 1889) (partly); and Tripriodon (Marsh 1889).

The generic name has a complicated history. It is attributed to Cope, 1882. Later, this was joined by "Meniscoessus" (Marsh 1889). The second usage apparently related to teeth described as belonging to small carnivorous dinosaurs. These were further christened Dipriodon, Tripriodon and others, including Triprotodon. Close similarities were then noticed with an already established dinosaur genus, Paronychodon (Cope 1876), also based on teeth from the Laramie Formation. Over time, an impressive school of names was synonymized under P. However, this is now considered a nomen dubium.

In 1929, George Gaylord Simpson published American Mesozoic Mammalia (Mem. of the Peabody Museum, 3 pt. 1; i-xv). The name Tripriodon ("three saw tooth") was resurrected. These "theropod" teeth were actually mammalian. The mammal T. since seems to have fallen from use.

Meniscoessus is a valid multituberculate, known from high quality remains including many teeth.

Species 

The species Meniscoessus collomensis was named by Jason A. Lillegraven in 1987. Fossil remains were found in the Upper Cretaceous strata of the Williams Fork Formation, in Colorado (United States). This species is known from only one site. It weighed an estimated 1.4 kg.

The species Meniscoessus conquistus was named by Edward Drinker Cope in 1882. Remains were found in the Maastrichtian (Upper Cretaceous) strata of Colorado and of the St. Mary River Formation of Canada.

The species Meniscoessus ferox was named by Richard C. Fox in 1971. Remains were found in Campanian (Upper Cretaceous) strata of the Upper Milk River Formation of Alberta, Canada. The holotype, collected in 1968, is in the University of Alberta collection.

The species Meniscoessus intermedius was named by Richard C. Fox in 1976. Remains were found in the Campanian - Maastrichtian (Upper Cretaceous) strata of the Oldman Formation of Alberta and New Mexico, Utah and Wyoming (USA). It is estimated to have weighed about 500 g, as much as a large rat.

The species Meniscoessus major was named by Loris Shano Russell in the 1930s. It is also known as Cimolomys major (Russell 1936). Remains were found in the Campanian (Upper Cretaceous) strata of Montana (USA) and Alberta, Canada. The weight of this species has been estimated at around a kilogram. The holotype is in Alberta.

The species Meniscoessus robustus was named by Othniel Charles Marsh in 1889. It has also been known as Cimolomys sculptusy; Dipriodon lacunatus; D. lunatus (Marsh 1889); D. robustus (Marsh 1889); Halodon sculptus (Marsh 1889); M. borealis (Simpson 1927); M. coelatus; M. fragilis; M. greeni (Wilson R.W. 1987); M. lunatus; M. sculptus; Moeniscoessus  robustus; Oracodon anceps (Marsh 1889); O. conulus  (Marsh 1892); Selenacodon fragilis (Marsh 1889); and Tripriodon coelatus (Marsh 1889). Remains were discovered in Maastrichtian (Upper Cretaceous) and possibly Paleocene strata of Wyoming, Montana, South Dakota (USA) and the St. Mary's River Formation in Canada. Marsh authored a swamp of names. The weight of this species is estimated to have been about 3.3 kg. The first usage of M. robustus seems to go back to Osborn in 1891.

The species Meniscoessus seminoensis was named by Jaelyn J. Eberle and Jason A. Lillegraven in 1998. Remains were found in Campanian - Maastrichtian (Upper Cretaceous) strata of the Ferris Formation in Wyoming. A 3.5 cm lower jaw was found near the Seminoe mountains. It has a close resemblance to M. robustus. It was somewhere between "rat-sized" and 3.5 kilograms, depending upon which source. An alternative name for this location is "Leave No Toad Unturned."

Several other names have been in circulation, such as Meniscoessus bustus, Meniscoessus caperatus (Marsh 1889), and Meniscoessus coelatus. The first is probably a variant of M. robustus, while the latter two seem to have been connected with dinosaur teeth.

References 
 Lillegraven (1987), Stratigraphy and evolutionary implications of a new species of Meniscoessus (Multituberculata, Mammalia) from the Upper Cretaceous Williams Fork Formation, Moffat County, Colorado. Dakoterra 3, p. 46-56.
 Cope (1882), "Mammalia in the Laramie formation." American Naturalist xvi, p. 830-831.
 Marsh (1889), "Discovery of Cretaceous Mammalia." Am. J. Sci. (3) xxxviii: 81–92.
 Osborn (1891), "A review of the Cretaceous Mammalia." Proc. Acad. Nat. Sci., Phila., p. 124-135.
 Simpson (1929), "American Mesozoic Mammalia." Mem. Peabody Mus. Nat. Hist. iii (i), p. 1-235.
 Wilson (1987), Late Cretaceous (Fox Hills) multituberculates from the Red Owl local fauna of western South Dakota. Dakoterra 3, p. 118-122.
 Kielan-Jaworowska Z & Hurum JH (2001), "Phylogeny and Systematics of multituberculate mammals." Paleontology 44, p. 389-429.
 Fox (1976), Cretaceous mammals (Meniscoessus intermedius, new species, and Alphadon  sp.) from the lowermost Oldman Formation, Alberta. Canadian Journal of Earth Sciences, 13(9), p. 1216-1222, 4 figs.
 Fox (1971), "Early Campanian multituberculates (Mammalia: Allotheria) from the upper Milk River Formation, Alberta". Canadian Journal of Earth Sci. 8, p. 916-938.
 Much of this information has been derived from  MESOZOIC MAMMALS: "basal" Cimolodonta, Cimolomyidae, Boffiidae and Kogaionidae, an Internet directory

Cimolodonts
Cretaceous mammals
Extinct mammals of North America
Hell Creek fauna
Laramie Formation
Milk River Formation
Fossil taxa described in 1882
Taxa named by Edward Drinker Cope
Prehistoric mammal genera